Vaah! Life Ho Toh Aisi! is a 2005 Indian Hindi-language fantasy comedy drama film written and directed by Mahesh Manjrekar and produced by Sangeetha Ahir, starring Shahid Kapoor, Sanjay Dutt, Amrita Rao and Arshad Warsi. It was released on 23 December 2005.

This film draws inspiration from the films – Mudhal Thethi, It's a Wonderful Life, Naukri, Ghost and Bruce Almighty.

Plot
Aditya Verma, fondly called Adi Chachu or Adi Uncle (Shahid Kapoor) by the children of his brothers (Adi has two brothers, one died in a plane crash along with his wife), lives in a large mansion in Mumbai with his other brother (Mohnish Bahl), who has a drinking problem, sister-in-law, sister and grandmother. He is the only one working in the family. He falls in love with a tuition teacher, Priya (Amrita Rao). They confess their feelings to each other and plan to get married. However, while going to work to attend an important meeting, Adi is run over by a truck to save Parth (Parth Dave) and dies.
In the afterlife, he meets the Hindu god of death, Yama (Sanjay Dutt), a kind-hearted, emotional deity with designer clothes and a red car. Yamraj allows Adi to go back to Earth as a ghost to stop his evil uncle (Prem Chopra), who wants to sell Adi's mansion to industrialist Hirachand (Sharat Saxena). Adi enlists the aid of Shakti, a little boy who was being taken with Adi to heaven, to save his family home. At first, they reach Earth, but no one can listen, see and feel them. Then they meet Fakira Bhai B.P.C.M (Arshad Warsi), who gives them the power to touch humans as before they were not able to, then for his family, Yamraj comes and gives him the ability to see his family for a couple of minutes before he takes the both of them back—Shakti and Adi. When Adi's family sees Adi, they ask Yamraj to take them as well, as they don't want to live without Adi. Yamraj gets emotional and leaves him to stay with his family and the little boy Shakti also. When the family members wake up, they think that this was a bad dream, but only Adi and Shakti know that they died and came back to life. A film actor and Yamraj's lookalike, Sanjay Dutt, offers to buy Adi's property, but Adi refuses to sell his property and lives happily with Priya and his family.

Cast
 Shahid Kapoor as Aditya Verma (Adi Chachu)
 Sanjay Dutt as Yamaraj "Yama" and himself
 Amrita Rao as Piya, Aditya’s love interest 
 Arshad Warsi as Fakira B.P.C.M (Bhoot Pret se Connecting Medium)
 Prem Chopra as Harish 
 Adil Badshah as Shakti
 Shweta Basu Prasad as Shweta
 Vivek Shauq as Vishal Sharma
 Upasna Singh as Kitty Sharma, Vishal’s wife
 Suhasini Mulay as Dadi
 Sharat Saxena as Hirachand
 Mohnish Bahl as Sunil Verma
 Rajat Bedi as Punky
 Palak Jain as Palak
 Aman Verma as Magic show presenter
 Radhika Apte as Anjali
 Smita Jaykar as Piya's mother
 Parth Dave as Parth
 Ishaan Khatter as Ishaan
 Satya Manjrekar as Satya
 Ekta Sohini as Sunita
 Tanvi Hegde as Tanvi
 Syed Hussain Haider Abidi as Sunny
 Shivangi Kale as Shivangi
 Darshil Mashru as Chandu
 Sagar Kabbur as Vikram 'Vicky', Aditya’s friend 
 Atul Kale as Bahadur 
 Sanjeeda Sheikh as an item number in "Teri Yaad Yaad"
 Aamir Dalvi as Rohit, Anjali's fiancé.

Soundtrack

References

External links
 

2005 films
2000s Hindi-language films
2000s ghost films
2000s fantasy comedy films
Films directed by Mahesh Manjrekar
Films scored by Himesh Reshammiya
Films scored by Ajay–Atul
Indian ghost films
Indian fantasy comedy films
Hindu mythology in popular culture
2005 comedy films